Henri Aimé Jacques, Baron la Caze (24 July 1858 – 3 November 1910) was a French politician and equestrian. He served as a general councillor and participated at the 1900 Summer Olympics.

Personal life
La Caze was born in Gelos on 24 July 1858. His family was active politically; his father, Louis-Jacques la Caze, served in the French Parliament as both a deputy and senator. He died in Buenos Aires, Argentina, on 3 November 1910.

Politics
La Caze served as general councillor for Lasseube, Basses-Pyrénées.

Equestrian
La Caze competed in the mail coach event at the 1900 Summer Olympics.

References

External links

1858 births
1910 deaths
French politicians
French male equestrians
Olympic equestrians of France
Equestrians at the 1900 Summer Olympics